João Pedro Pinto Cardoso (born 10 February 1997) is a Portuguese footballer who plays as a midfielder for Torreense.

Club career
On 14 July 2021, he signed with Torreense.

References

External links

1997 births
Footballers from Porto
Living people
Association football midfielders
Portuguese footballers
Portugal youth international footballers
FC Porto B players
G.D. Estoril Praia players
S.C. Covilhã players
S.C.U. Torreense players
Liga Portugal 2 players